Machala Canton is a canton of Ecuador, located in the El Oro Province.  Its capital is the town of Machala.  Its population at the 2001 census was 217,696.

Demographics
Ethnic groups as of the Ecuadorian census of 2010:
Mestizo  78.6%
Afro-Ecuadorian  9.3%
White  9.2%
Montubio  1.5%
Indigenous  1.1%
Other  0.4%

References

Cantons of El Oro Province